Aurelio Herrera (June 14, 1876 – April 12, 1927) was an American professional boxer in the featherweight and lightweight divisions.

Aurelio Herrera is the first famous boxer of Latin American origin. He was known for his aggressive fighting style and strong punch. Two-thirds of his fights were won by knockout.

He was born in San José to Mexican immigrants. He later moved to Bakersfield with his parents and siblings as a child where he worked harvesting grapes.

Boxing career
After his pro debut in 1895, Herrera amassed a record of 32–0–2 (32KO) and two newspaper decision victories before getting a chance for a world title. On May 29, 1901, in San Francisco, he challenged reigning featherweight champion Terry McGovern. Reports on the fight by The Evening Tribune stated that, "The fight had not progressed one minute of the first round before it became evident to all that McGovern was not making an effort to end the contest, but was content with buffeting Herrera about the ring at his pleasure." By the fifth round, McGovern had thoroughly beaten the challenger to the point that Herrera would not rise from the knockdowns anymore. This defeat was the first defeat of Herrera's professional career. He went on one more significant winning streak before losing to other top contenders. On October 15, 1902, he lost to future featherweight champion Abe Attell in a 15 round decision to decide a contender for the vacant featherweight title. Attell skillfully avoided Herrera's strong blows and went on to win the vacant title the following year. In 1903, Herrera scored notable knockouts against Kid Broad and Eddie Santry. In March 1904, he again lost to Attell on points. On September 5 of the same year in Butte, Montana, he lost a hard-fought 20-round decision against Battling Nelson. 

On January 12, 1906, in Los Angeles, Herrera's most notable victory came when he knocked out former featherweight world champion Young Corbett II in the fifth round. He fought a few more fights afterward and ended his career in 1909. Although he made a lot of money as a prizefighter, he squandered his fortune and in 1927 was sentenced to 10 days in jail for vagrancy. He died two months later, two days after the death of Corbett.

Herrera fought a career total of 102 fights, of which he won 68, lost 12, drew 14 and had 2 no contests. In newspaper decisions he held a record of 2–2–1.

Fights against Hall of Famers
Despite not making it into the International Boxing Hall of Fame himself, Herrera had a total of 6 fights and a record of 1–4–1 (1KO) versus HOF's having lost to Abe Attell (twice), Battling Nelson, and Terry McGovern. He drew against Harry Lewis and defeated Young Corbett II.

Professional boxing record
All information in this section is derived from BoxRec, unless otherwise stated.

Official record

All newspaper decisions are officially regarded as “no decision” bouts and are not counted to the win/loss/draw column.

Unofficial record

Record with the inclusion of newspaper decisions to the win/loss/draw column.

References

External links

 
 
 
 https://www.scribd.com/document/38844748/First-Mexican-American-Boxing-Champ
 https://cdnc.ucr.edu/cgi-bin/cdnc?a=d&d=SFC19031118.2.121.9&e=-------en--20--1--txt-txIN--------1
 https://sep.yimg.com/ay/yhst-41693642061643/boxing-news-clipping-472-rocky-graziano-vs-tony-zale-battling-nelson-aurelio-herrera-5.gif
 http://www.laprensa-sandiego.org/archieve/nov12/greg.htm

1876 births
1927 deaths
American male boxers
Boxers from California
Sportspeople from San Jose, California
Featherweight boxers
Lightweight boxers